Ancillae (plural) or ancilla (singular) was the term for female house slaves in the Ancient Rome, as well as in Europe during the Middle Ages.

Ancillae was the common title for female house slaves during the Roman Empire.  In Medieval Europe, slavery was gradually replaced by serfdom, but a small minority of female slaves long remained common as household servants in wealthy homes. This was most common in Italy, Spain and France.

In Europe, it was banned to make Christians into slaves, but allowed to make non-Christians into slaves.  Similarly, it was banned to make Muslims slaves in the Muslim world, but permitted to take non-Muslims as slaves.  This created a slave trade in which slaves from the Muslim world were sold to Christian Europe, and slaves from Europe were sold to the Muslim Middle East.  The merchants of this slave trade were often Venetian merchants.

The slaves normally converted to Christianity or Islam respectively after they had been bought, but were still kept in slavery.  While it was legal for an ancilla to marry, she as well as her children were still slaves, and because this created legal confusion between the legal guardianship of a husband towards his wife and children, it was not well seen for an ancilla to marry, which kept the slave market going.  Most of the ancillae came from the Greek Orthodox Balkans: while Christians, they were not recognized as such by the Catholic church, hence taking them as slaves were considered legal.

References

 Hannah Barker: That Most Precious Merchandise: The Mediterranean Trade in Black Sea Slaves ...
 David Eltis, Keith R. Bradley, Stanley L. Engerman, Craig Perry, Paul Cartledge, David Richardson, Seymour Drescher: The Cambridge World History of Slavery: Volume 2, AD 500-AD 1420

House slaves
Women's history
Medieval women
Slavery in Europe
Medieval slaves
Slavery in ancient Rome
Women in ancient Rome
Ancient Roman slaves and freedmen
Women and slavery